Information Processing Centre or Information Processing Institute (OPI) is a Polish research institute supervised by Polish Ministry of Science and Higher Education. It creates and maintains software for the Polish Ministry of Science and Higher Education. Its goal is to provide quick and easy access to up-to-date and detailed databases about science in Poland as part of Polish and European Union programme. It oversees several databases, listing Polish research institutes, Polish scientists, their works, conferences, etc.

References

External links
 

Research institutes in Poland